The Bennetts Lane Big Band is an Australian large ensemble band playing jazz compositions and improvisations that was formed in 2001 to provide an avenue for original new work.

Three musicians, Eugene Ball, Andrea Keller and Nick Haywood were approached by the management of Bennetts Lane Jazz Club to form the group. An 11 piece group was formed and the band has performed on a regular monthly basis from 2001 to 2008.

The Bennetts Lane Big Band performed the award-winning jazz composition by Eugene Ball, Fool Poet's Portion suite, at a benefit concert for the Melbourne Jazz Co-op in January 2008.

The Snip
The band recorded an album of original compositions in May 2002 on the ABC Jazz label called The Snip.

Awards

Australian Jazz Bell Awards
The Australian Jazz Bell Awards, (also known as the Bell Awards or The Bells), are annual music awards for the jazz music genre in Australia. They commenced in 2003.

|-
| 2003
| Bennetts Lane Big Band
| Australian Jazz Venue of the Year
| 
|-
| 2004
| Bennetts Lane Big Band
| Australian Jazz Venue of the Year
| 
|-
| 2006
| Bennetts Lane Big Band
| Australian Jazz Venue of the Year
| 
|-

wins only

References

2001 establishments in Australia
ARIA Award winners
Australian jazz ensembles
Musical groups established in 2001
Victoria (Australia) musical groups